Joseph William Koontz (born August 13, 1945) is a former American football wide receiver who played one season for the New York Giants. He was drafted in the 9th round (234th overall) by them. He played in all 14 games, and had 1 kick return. He also played for the ACFL Long Island Bulls in 1969.

References

1945 births
Living people
New York Giants players
American football wide receivers
San Francisco State Gators football players
People from Visalia, California